Fez II: The Contract is an adventure for fantasy role-playing games published by Mayfair Games in 1983.

Contents
Fez II: The Contract is a scenario for character levels 3–8.  Player characters from the modern world are engaged by the time-traveling wizard Fez to perform seven impossible feats.  The adventure is a mixture of magic and technology.

Publication history
Fez II: The Contract was written by James Robert and Len Bland, with art by Victoria Poyser, and was published by Mayfair Games in 1983 as a 40-page book.

Reception

References

Fantasy role-playing game adventures
Role Aids
Role-playing game supplements introduced in 1983